Johann Holetschek (29 August 1846 in Thuma – 20 November 1923 in Vienna) was an Austrian astronomer, known for his research on comets.  Born in Thuma, in Lower Austria, he worked at the observatory of the University of Vienna.  He died at Vienna.      

The crater Holetschek on the Moon is named after him.

Sources
All About Austria

19th-century Austrian astronomers
1846 births
1923 deaths
Discoverers of comets
20th-century Austrian astronomers
People from Waidhofen an der Thaya District
Academic staff of the University of Vienna
University of Vienna alumni